A Manic Pixie Dream Girl (MPDG) is a stock character type in films. Film critic Nathan Rabin, who coined the term after observing Kirsten Dunst's character in Elizabethtown (2005), said that the MPDG "exists solely in the fevered imaginations of sensitive writer-directors to teach broodingly soulful young men to embrace life and its infinite mysteries and adventures".

The Manic Pixie Dream Girl, like some other stock characters such as the Magical Negro, seems to exist only to provide spiritual or mystical help to the protagonist. The MPDG has no discernible inner life. Instead, her central purpose is to provide the protagonist with important life lessons.

Origin
Film critic Nathan Rabin coined the term in 2007. In his series of columns "My Year of Flops" (later released  in book form) for The A.V. Club, he reviewed the 2005 film Elizabethtown; talking about Kirsten Dunst's character, he said "Dunst embodies a character type I like to call The Manic Pixie Dream Girl. [This character] exists solely in the fevered imaginations of sensitive writer-directors to teach broodingly soulful young men to embrace life and its infinite mysteries and adventures."

A year later, The A.V. Club ran a piece listing 16 characters they deemed MPDGs, and the new term was quickly referenced by other popular culture media.

Examples

MPDGs are usually static characters who have eccentric personality quirks and are unabashedly girlish. They invariably serve as the romantic interest for a (most often brooding or depressed) male protagonist. Notable examples of female characters described as a Manic Pixie Dream Girl follow:

The A.V. Club points to Katharine Hepburn's character in Bringing Up Baby (1938) as one of the earliest examples of the archetype.
 Clarisse in the 1953 Ray Bradbury novel Fahrenheit 451. Critic Jimmy Maher of The Digital Antiquarian wrote: "Bradbury has been credited, with some truth, with foreshadowing or even inspiring everything from 24-hour news as entertainment to the Sony Walkman in Fahrenheit 451. I’ve never, however, seen him properly credited for his most insidious creation: the Manic Pixie Dream Girl."
 Holly Golightly in Breakfast at Tiffany's, played by cultural icon Audrey Hepburn in the 1961 film, is an example of a vintage Manic Pixie Dream Girl, according to Grace Smith, writing for Hollywood Insider: "The effortlessly eccentric Holly Golightly balances out the brooding writer Paul Varjack."
 Goldie Hawn's character, Jill, in Butterflies Are Free is "a happy hippie who helps blind lawyer Edward Albert learn to live on his own and stand up to his fretful, frightful mother."
 In Autumn in New York, "the square dude in question is uptight businessman Richard Gere, and the charming minx who breathes life into his sorry existence and reawakens his libido is delightful pixie/crazy free spirit Winona Ryder".
 Penélope Cruz's character in the movie Vanilla Sky (2001) is included on Jamie Loftus' list of MPDGs, published by BDCWire.    
 Natalie Portman's character in the movie Garden State (2004), written and directed by Zach Braff. In his review of Garden State, Roger Ebert described this kind of rather unbelievable "movie creature" as "a girl who is completely available, absolutely desirable and really likes you." He notes, "we learn almost nothing about her, except that she's great to look at and has those positive attributes".
In asking whether the stock character's popularity has peaked, Aisha Harris in writing for Slate Magazine, considers Jennifer Lawrence's character in the movie Silver Linings Playbook (2012). She finds that Lawrence's character could be considered another iteration of the MPDG, but ultimately decides she is a bit more complicated. 
Margot Robbie's character in Amsterdam (2022) is characterized by Christy Lemire writing for RogerEbert.com as a Manic Pixie Dream Girl.

Counterexamples
The titular character of Annie Hall (1977) is often called an MPDG, although Dominic Kelly has argued in The Guardian that she is not, as she has her own goals independent of the male lead and ultimately leaves him.
Kate Winslet's character Clementine in Eternal Sunshine of the Spotless Mind (2004) acknowledges the trope of the Manic Pixie Dream Girl and rejects the type, in a remark to Jim Carrey's Joel: "Too many guys think I'm a concept, or I complete them, or I'm gonna make them alive. But I'm just a fucked-up girl who's lookin' for my own peace of mind; don't assign me yours."
Eva Wiseman, writing for The Guardian about Zooey Deschanel's character Summer in 500 Days of Summer (2009), concluded: "While Deschanel's Summer is as whimsical as a traditional MPDG, the character rises above the cliché through her flaws." However, director Marc Webb stated, "Yes, Summer has elements of the manic pixie dream girl – she is an immature view of a woman. She's Tom's view of a woman. He doesn't see her complexity and the consequence for him is heartbreak. In Tom's eyes, Summer is perfection, but perfection has no depth. Summer's not a girl, she's a phase."
Eve, the lead character of Stuart Murdoch's musical film God Help the Girl (2014), has also been noted as a subversion of the trope, with actress Emily Browning approaching the character as "the anti-manic pixie dream girl" and describing her as having "her own inner life" and being "incredibly self-absorbed; [...] Olly wants her to be his muse and she's like, 'No, I'm not having that. I'm gonna go do my own shit.

Responses to the term
In an interview in New York about her 2012 film Ruby Sparks, actress and screenwriter Zoe Kazan noted that the term should only be used to criticize writers who create one-dimensional female characters, not actresses. She ultimately expressed skepticism over the use of the term, noting that its use could be reductive, diminutive, and misogynistic. She disagreed that Hepburn's character in Bringing Up Baby is a MPDG: "I think that to lump together all individual, original quirky women under that rubric is to erase all difference."

In a December 2012 video, AllMovie critic Cammila Collar embraced the term as an effective description of one-dimensional female characters who seek only the happiness of the male protagonist, and who do not deal with any complex issues of their own. She noted that the pejorative use of the term, then, is mainly directed at writers who do not give these female characters more to do than bolster the spirits of their male partners.

In December 2012, Slates Aisha Harris posited that "critiques of the MPDG may have become more common than the archetype itself," suggesting that filmmakers had been forced to become "self-aware about such characters" in the years since Rabin's coining of the phrase and that the trope had largely disappeared from film.

In July 2013, Kat Stoeffel, for The Cut, argued that the term has its uses, but that it has sometimes been deployed in ways that are sexist. For example, she noted that "it was levied, criminally, at Diane Keaton in Annie Hall and Zooey Deschanel, the actual person. How could a real person's defining trait be a lack of interior life?".

Similar sentiments were elucidated by Monika Bartyzel for The Week in April 2013, who wrote "this once-useful piece of critical shorthand has devolved into laziness and sexism". Bartyzel argues that "[The term] 'Manic Pixie Dream Girl' was useful when it commented on the superficiality of female characterizations in male-dominated journeys, but it has since devolved into a pejorative way to deride unique women in fiction and reality".

Critics
In July 2014, writing for Salon, Rabin stated that the term "Manic Pixie Dream Girl" had frequently been deployed in ways that are sexist and had become as much of a cliché as the MPDG-trope itself.

Rabin acknowledged that the phrase has its uses in specific, limited contexts, saying that "the phrase was useful precisely because, while still fairly flexible, it also benefited from a certain specificity". However, he continued by stating that the overwhelming popularity of the term, coupled with the oversimplified definition he gave when coining it, had led to it becoming a kind of “unstoppable monster”. He wrote "by giving an idea a name and a fuzzy definition, you apparently also give it power. And in my case, that power spun out of control".

Rabin asserted that it had gotten to the point where people were commonly using the term to critique real women and actresses (instead of fictitious, one-dimensional characters) and to describe things that don’t actually fall under the rubric of the MPDG. In his conclusion, Rabin noted that many nuanced female characters cannot be classified in such an all-encompassing, restricted nature and apologized to pop culture for coining a term that is so pervasive and ambiguous, and he stated that the term should be retired and “put to rest."

Despite Rabin’s calls, some film critics continue to use the term, and writers continue to produce explanatory articles and videos that attempt to define it.

Manic Pixie Dream Boy
A possible male version of this trope, the Manic Pixie Dream Boy or Manic Pixie Dream Guy, was found in Augustus Waters from the film version of The Fault in Our Stars (2014); he was given this title in a 2014 Vulture article, in which Matt Patches stated, "he's a bad boy, he's a sweetheart, he's a dumb jock, he's a nerd, he's a philosopher, he's a poet, he's a victim, he's a survivor, he's everything everyone wants in their lives, and he's a fallacious notion of what we can actually have in our lives."

The Manic Pixie Dream Boy trope has also been pointed out in sitcoms such as Parks and Recreation and 30 Rock. The female protagonists of these shows are married to men (Adam Scott's Ben Wyatt and James Marsden's Criss Chros, respectively), who, according to a 2012 Grantland article, "patiently [tamp] down her stubbornness and temper while appreciating her quirks, helping her to become her best possible self."

Similar tropes

Algorithm-defined fantasy girl

Another version of the Manic Pixie Dream Girl is the algorithm-defined fantasy girl. Although the latter is not human, but a robot or artificial intelligence, her function is the same: to fulfill the desires of the male character and to help him in his journey without having any desires or journey of her own, e.g. Joi in the 2017 film Blade Runner 2049.

See also

 Damsel in distress
 Foil (fiction)
 Gamine
 Golden fantasy
 Johanson analysis
 Mary Sue
 Smurfette principle

References

Cultural concepts
Female stock characters
2007 neologisms
Women in fiction